

This is list of museums in New South Wales, Australia. Museums are defined for this context as institutions that collect and care for objects of cultural, artistic, scientific, or historical interest and make their collections or related exhibits available for public viewing. Non-profit art galleries, university art galleries, other non-profit organisations, government entities, and private businesses are included.

According to the 2013 NSW Museum and Gallery Sector Census and Survey conducted by Museums & Galleries of NSW, a state funded support agency, there were 495 operational museums and galleries located in NSW in that year. They include 293 community-run and -managed museums, 57 public and regional galleries, 51 public and regional museums, 37 community-run and -managed galleries and artist run initiatives and 23 Aboriginal cultural centres.  The balance of the identified organisations were state or national galleries or museums located in NSW. It does not include private museums or commercial galleries.

Museums & Galleries of NSW provides a complete list and profiles for these institutions on their website.

For a list of publicly-funded regional galleries, refer to Regional and Public Galleries Association of New South Wales.

Museums

Defunct museums
 Legends Surf Museum, Coffs Harbour
Old Sydney Town

See also
 List of museums in Australia

References

 Museums and Galleries NSW
 Museums and Galleries in Sydney

New South Wales

Museums